Jorge Daniel Martínez (born 20 June 1973) is a former Argentine football defender.

Born in Montecarlo, Misiones, Martínez started his professional playing career in 1993 with Deportivo Mandiyú. In 1995, he joined Club Atlético Independiente where he played for three seasons. During this spell with Independiente, he was called up for the 1997 Copa América tournament. In 1998, he joined River Plate.

In 1999, Martinez went to Spain to play for Real Zaragoza but only made one league appearance before returning for a second spell with Independiente.

In 2001, he joined River Plate's fiercest rivals, Boca Juniors but only stayed with the club for one season. He then played for Colón de Santa Fe and a third spell with Independiente.

In 2005, Martinez joined Olimpo de Bahía Blanca but left the club for newly promoted Nueva Chicago when Olimpo suffered relegation. The following season Nueva Chicago were relegated and Martínez returned to Olimpo in the 2nd division.

References

External links

 Argentine Primera statistics

1973 births
Living people
Sportspeople from Misiones Province
Argentine footballers
Argentina international footballers
Argentine expatriate footballers
1997 Copa América players
Association football defenders
Argentine Primera División players
Deportivo Mandiyú footballers
Club Atlético Independiente footballers
Club Atlético River Plate footballers
Boca Juniors footballers
Club Atlético Colón footballers
Olimpo footballers
Nueva Chicago footballers
Real Zaragoza players
Expatriate footballers in Spain
Argentine expatriate sportspeople in Spain